1973 in philosophy

Events
The Twin Earth thought experiment is presented by Hilary Putnam in his paper "Meaning and Reference".

Publications
 Bruner, Jerome, Beyond the Information Given: Studies in the Psychology of Knowing. W. W. Norton, Oxford, UK
 Dummett, Michael, Frege: Philosophy of Language (rev. 1981)
 Geertz, Clifford, "Thick Description: Toward an Interpretive Theory of Culture." In: The Interpretation of Cultures: Selected Essays. (New York: Basic Books) 3-30.
 Herzberger, H. G., "Dimension of Truth," Journal of Philosophical Logic, 2, 535–556.
 Karttunen, Lauri, "Presuppositions of Compound Sentences," Linguistic Inquiry, IV:2, 169–193.
 Karttunen, Lauri, "Presupposition and Linguistic Context," Theoretical Linguistics, 1, pp. 181–194 (1974).  Presented at the 1973 Winter Meeting of the Linguistic Society of America in San Diego
 Keenan, E., "Presupposition in Natural Logic," The Monist, 57:3, 344–370.
 Lakoff, George, "Pragmatics and Natural Logic," in: Murphy, J., A. Rogers, and R. Wall (eds.)
 Lewis, D. K., Counterfactuals,  Cambridge, Massachusetts: Harvard University Press.
 Liberman, M. "Alternatives," in: Papers from the Ninth Regional Meeting of the Chicago Linguistic Society, University of Chicago, Chicago, Illinois.
 Morgan, J. L., Presupposition and the Representation of Meaning, unpublished Doctoral Dissertation, University of Chicago, Chicago, Illinois.
 Murphy, J., A. Rogers, and R. Wall (eds.) Proceedings of the Texas Conference on Performatives, Presuppositions, and Conversational Implicatures, Center for Applied Linguistics, Washington, D. C.
 Stalnaker, R. C., "Presuppositions," Journal of Philosophical Logic, 2, 447-457
 Thomason, R. H., "Semantics, Pragmatics, Conversation, and Presupposition," in: Murphy, J.,  A. Rogers, and R. Wall (eds.)

Births
May 9 - Luuk van Middelaar, Dutch historian and political philosopher

Deaths
April 28 - Jacques Maritain, French Catholic philosopher, 90
May 26 - Karl Löwith, German philosopher, student of Heidegger, 76
July 7 - Max Horkheimer, German philosopher, Institute for Social Research, 78
September 5 - Roy Wood Sellars, US philosopher of critical realism and religious humanism, 93 
October 10 - Ludwig von Mises, philosopher, Austrian School economist, and classical liberal, 92
November 16 - Alan Watts, British philosopher, writer and speaker, 58

See also
 Yom Kippur War
 1973 oil crisis

Philosophy
20th-century philosophy
Philosophy by year